State Route 189 (SR 189) is a primary state highway in the U.S. state of Virginia. Known for much of its length as South Quay Road, the state highway runs  from U.S. Route 258 (US 258) near Franklin east to US 58 Business in Suffolk.

Route description

SR 189 begins at an intersection with US 258 (Smiths Ferry Road) in Southampton County south of the city of Franklin. The state highway heads northeast as two-lane undivided South Quay Road, which passes close to a bend in the Blackwater River before curving east to cross the river into the independent city of Suffolk. The state highway curves north and meets the western end of SR 272, onto which the South Quay Road name continues while SR 189 heads north as an unnamed road. SR 189 meets US 58 and US 258 (Franklin Bypass) at a partial cloverleaf interchange. The roadway continues north as US 258 toward Franklin while SR 189 runs concurrently with US 58 east on the four-lane divided highway. The two highways meet the eastern end of SR 272 and assume the name South Quay Road. Just west of the community of Holland, SR 189 splits north from US 58 along two-lane undivided South Quay Road. The state highway has a grade crossing of Norfolk Southern Railway's Franklin District just south of its eastern terminus at US 58 Business, which heads east as Holland Road and east as Ruritan Boulevard.

Major intersections

References

External links

Virginia Highways Project: VA 189

189
State Route 189
State Route 189